The 2012 Conference USA Football Championship Game was played on December 1, 2012 between the Tulsa Golden Hurricane, winners of the Conference USA West division and the UCF Knights, the winners of the East division.

It was the third match-up between the Golden Hurricane and Knights in the C-USA Championship Game and the first in Tulsa. The two teams previously met in 2005 and 2007, which were both played in Orlando.

Game summary
Under conference rules, the game was held at the home field of the team with the best record in conference play; since both teams finished C-USA play at 7–1, but Tulsa defeated UCF in their head-to-head match-up two weeks earlier, the game was held at the Golden Hurricane's home field, Skelly Field at H. A. Chapman Stadium in Tulsa, Oklahoma.

The game marked UCF's last conference match-up as a member of Conference USA, as the Knights moved to the American Athletic Conference for the 2013 season.

Scoring summary

References

Championship
Conference USA Football Championship Game
Tulsa Golden Hurricane football games
UCF Knights football games
Conference USA Football Championship Game
Conference USA football